Qiwñani (Aymara qiwña a kind of tree (polylepis), -ni a suffix, "the one with the qiwña", hispanicized spelling Queuñane) is a mountain in the Andes of southern Peru, about  high. It is located in the Tacna Region, Tacna Province, Palca District, near the Chilean border. Qiwñani lies north of Phaq'u Q'awa.

References 

Mountains of Tacna Region
Mountains of Peru